There were a total of four Somali detainees in Guantanamo of 
a total of 778 detainees that have been held in the Guantanamo Bay detention camps, in Cuba since the camps opened on January 11, 2002.
The camp population peaked in 2004 at approximately 660.  Only nineteen new suspects, all "high value detainees" have been transferred there since the United States Supreme Court's ruling in Rasul v. Bush.  As of January 2008 the camp population stands at approximately 285.

When the DoD was forced to publish its first official list of detainees, on May 15, 2006, it listed two detainees from Somalia.
In 2006 and 2007 two more detainees from Somalia were transferred to Guantanamo from the CIA's network of "black sites".

Somali detainees in Guantanamo

References